This is a list of British television related events from 1940.

Events
There are no events for 1940 in British television as broadcasting has been suspended for the duration of the Second World War, amid fears that the signals would help German bombers. Television broadcasting resumes in 1946.

Births
 19 January – Mike Reid, entertainer, comedian and actor (died 2007)
 22 January – John Hurt, actor (died 2017)
 2 February – David Jason, born David White, actor
 6 February – Jimmy Tarbuck, comedian
 12 February – Ralph Bates, English actor (died 1991)
 20 February – Jimmy Greaves, footballer and television pundit (died 2021)
 22 February – Judy Cornwell, English actress
 5 March – Malcolm Hebden, actor (Coronation Street)
 2 April – Penelope Keith, actress
 10 April – Gloria Hunniford, Northern Irish television and radio presenter and singer
 24 April – Chris Kelly, English television host and producer
 7 June – Ronald Pickup, actor (died 2021)
 16 June – Carole Ann Ford, actress
 20 June – John Mahoney, actor (died 2018 in the United States)
 22 June – Esther Rantzen, journalist and television presenter
 23 June – Adam Faith, born Terry Nelhams, pop singer, screen actor and financial journalist (died 2003)
 27 June – Eric Richard, actor
 13 July – Patrick Stewart, actor
 17 July – Tim Brooke-Taylor, broadcast comedy performer (died 2020)
 31 July – Roy Walker, Northern Irish comedian
 16 August – John Craven, journalist and television presenter
 3 September – Pauline Collins, character actress
 9 October – John Lennon, rock singer-songwriter, screen actor and activist (killed 1980 in the United States)
 14 October 
Cliff Richard, born Harry Webb in British India, pop singer and film actor
Christopher Timothy, Welsh actor, television director and writer
 19 October – Michael Gambon, Irish-born actor
 29 October – Jack Shepherd, actor, playwright, director and saxophonist
 27 November – John Alderton, character actor
 11 December – Tony Adams, Welsh actor

See also
 1940 in British music
 1940 in the United Kingdom
 List of British films of 1940

References